Marconia is a genus of air-breathing land snails, terrestrial pulmonate gastropod mollusks in the family Streptaxidae.

Marconia is the type genus of the subfamily Marconiinae.

Distribution 
Distribution of the genus Marconia include:
 Afrotropical
 Comores

Species
Species within the genus Marconia include:
 Marconia recta Bourguignat, 1890 (taxon inquirendum)

References

Streptaxidae